Anastasia Bogdanovski (born 30 July 1993) is a Macedonian swimmer. At the 2016 Summer Olympics, she competed in the women's 200 metre freestyle, finishing in 33rd place overall in the heats. Her time of 2:00.52 in the heat set a new Macedonian swimming record.

College career
Bogdanovski competed at Johns Hopkins University from 2012 through 2015. She was named the NCAA Division III Women's Swimmer of the Year in 2014.

Post-College career
Bogdanovski attended the Rutgers New Jersey Medical School and after graduating with the MD degree, she entered the general surgery residency program at Beth Israel Deaconess Medical Center.

References

Macedonian female swimmers
Living people
Olympic swimmers of North Macedonia
Swimmers at the 2016 Summer Olympics
Macedonian female freestyle swimmers
Place of birth missing (living people)
Johns Hopkins Blue Jays athletes
1993 births